Albert Edson Sleeper (December 31, 1862 – May 13, 1934) was an American politician and served as the 29th governor of Michigan from 1917 to 1921.

Biography
Sleeper was born on December 31, 1862, in Bradford, Vermont and was educated at the Bradford Academy.

In 1884, he moved to Lexington, Michigan, where he was a successful businessman owning several banks and extensive real estate.  Sleeper also worked in mercantile industries.  In 1901, he married Mary C. Moore.

Sleeper served in the Michigan State Senate, 1901–1904.  The following year, he became a member of the Republican State Committee until 1907.  Then he served as State Treasurer of Michigan from 1909 to 1913 under Governors, Fred M. Warner and Chase Osborn.

Sleeper was elected Governor of Michigan by a popular vote on November 7, 1916, defeating Democrat Edwin F. Sweet. He was re-elected to a second term in 1918. He served during most of World War I and started measures to supply men, provisions, and arms for the war effort. Also during his four years in office, a department of animal husbandry, a department of labor, and a public utilities commission were established.  A county road system was advanced, a permanent state police department was founded, and the first driver's license was issued.   Sleeper signed the State Parks Act creating the State Park system and an epidemic of the Spanish influenza was dealt with.  On April 19, 1917, Governor Sleeper created the Michigan State Troops Permanent Force (Michigan State Police).

In 1928, Sleeper served as a presidential elector for Michigan to elect Herbert Hoover as U.S. President.  He died on May 13, 1934, in Lexington, Michigan, at the age of seventy-one and is interred at Lexington Municipal Cemetery.

Legacy
In 1944, Huron State Park in Caseville, Michigan, was renamed Albert E. Sleeper State Park.
The public library in Ubly, Michigan, is also named after Sleeper.

References
Biography at National Governors Association
Political Graveyard
Albert E. Sleeper State Park

Further reading
Fuller, George, Ed., Messages of the Governors of Michigan, Volume 4 (East Lansing, Michigan: Michigan State University Press) ; .

1862 births
1934 deaths
Republican Party governors of Michigan
Republican Party Michigan state senators
State treasurers of Michigan
19th-century American Episcopalians
Burials in Michigan
People from Lexington, Michigan
People from Bradford, Vermont
People from Huron County, Michigan
20th-century American politicians
20th-century American Episcopalians